Angus Macdonald FRSE FRCPE (18 April 1836 – 10 February 1886), was a Scottish physician, obstetrician and lecturer at the University of Edinburgh. He served as President of the Edinburgh Obstetrical Society from 1879 to 1881.

Early life 
Macdonald was born in Aberdeen, Aberdeenshire, Scotland, he was the son of Margaret Bremner of Newmill, Banffshire and her husband, James Macdonald of Lochmaddy, North Uist, a road contractor. His father died when he was 11, leaving a widow and five children. He went to work as a farm labourer in Grange, Banffshire; his formal education was limited to two years in the parish school as a result. However, supported by the local schoolmaster, Arthur Gerrard, and his mother, Margaret Bremner Macdonald, "a woman of character and of vigorous intellect", he won a competitive scholarship to King's College, Aberdeen at the age of 19.

Macdonald received his general degree (MA) in 1859 and was awarded the Hutton Prize. He spent a year studying theology at the University of Edinburgh before switching to study medicine, graduating with an MD in 1865. His thesis was entitled "Notes of three renal cases illustrative of vasomotor neuroses."

Medical career 
From 1864 he began practicing as a GP in Edinburgh and lecturing in pharmacology and midwifery at the University of Edinburgh.

In addition to starting a private medical practice, Macdonald lectured frequently and served as the Physician to the Royal Infirmary and the Physician to the Royal Maternity Hospital. He became a fellow of the Royal College of Surgeons in 1865 and a fellow of the Royal College of Physicians in 1869. He authored many articles in The Lancet. In 1871 he was elected a Fellow of the Royal Society of Edinburgh his proposer being Sir William Turner.

In 1878, he published "On The Bearings of Chronic Disease of the Heart Upon Pregnancy, Parturition, and Childbed," a textbook in obstetrics in use for over 50 years. In 1879, he became President of the Obstetrics Society of Edinburgh, which he held until 1881. A group of obstetricians in the UK named their society the Macdonald Club in his honour, and in 2008 the Royal Medical Society began publishing an Obstetrics Journal dedicated in his memory.

Death 

During the last four years of his life, Macdonald had a recurrent lung infection. Advised by his physicians to reduce his commitments, he spent a year in the Riviera. He died at home, 29 Charlotte Square on 10 February 1886. After his death the house was bought and occupied by a former junior colleague, Dr David Berry Hart.

Family 
On 19 April 1866 Macdonald married Ann Finlayson (1839–1917), daughter of Thomas Finlayson, the long-time minister of Rose Street United Presbyterian Church in Edinburgh, and his wife Janet Chrystal Carrick. They had eight children: James Warburton Begbie Macdonald (1867–1869) who was named after one of Dr Macdonald's professors and died at age two of meningitis, Thomas Finlayson Macdonald (1868–1896) who became a physician and died age 28 of pernicious anemia, Jessie Chrystal Macdonald (1870–1931) who married Robert Gordon the treasurer of Quaker Oats and emigrated to America, Angus Macdonald Jr (1872–1949) who became a physician in Edinburgh, Robert John Macdonald (1874–1937) who emigrated to America to work for Quaker Oats, Margaret Bremner Macdonald (1876–1956) who did not marry and remained in Edinburgh with her mother, George Andrew Macdonald (1878–1949) who emigrated to America to work for Quakers Oats and married his second cousin Margaret Stuart, Ranald Macdonald (1881–1919).

References

Further reading
 
 Macdonald, Angus. On The Bearings of Chronic Disease of the Heart Upon Pregnancy, Parturition, and Childbed, London: 1878.
 Comrie, J. History of Scottish Medicine, 2, pp 685–7, London: Bailliere, Tindall, & Cox, 1932.
 Chamberlain, Geoffrey. "Angus Macdonald MD FRCP, FRCS 1836-1885", Archived biographical sketch. Royal College of Physicians, Edinburgh: undated.
 The Scotsman, 11 February 1886, p 5. Edinburgh. "The Late Dr Angus Macdonald."
 "Angus Macdonald 1834-1886", The Dictionary of National Biography, M, p. 474. London: Smith, Elder & Co., 1908.
 "Minutes of the Edinburgh Obstetrical Society 1879-81", Royal College of Physicians, Edinburgh.
 Royal College of Physicians Staff (1980). "Letter to Dr Peter W. Howie, Centre for Reproductive Biology, Edinburgh", regarding Angus Macdonald. Royal College of Physicians, Edinburgh, 11 July 1980.
 

Scottish obstetricians
Alumni of the University of Edinburgh
19th-century Scottish medical doctors
1886 deaths
People from Aberdeen
Alumni of the University of Aberdeen
Scottish medical writers
Academics of the University of Edinburgh
1836 births